Tetrakis(cyclopentadienyl)uranium(IV), U(C5H5)4, abbreviated U(Cp)4, is an organouranium compound composed of a uranium atom sandwiched between four cyclopentadienide rings.

Synthesis and properties 
Tetrakis(cyclopentadienyl)uranium(IV) was first prepared in 1962 by Ernst Otto Fischer, who reacted uranium tetrachloride with excess potassium cyclopentadienide in benzene and obtained the complex as red crystals at 6% yield:

UCl4 + 4 KCp → U(Cp)4 + 4 KCl

Solid crystals of U(Cp)4 are air-stable, but the benzene solution is extremely air-sensitive.

Reduction of U(Cp)4 with uranium metal yields tris(cyclopentadienyl)uranium(III), U(Cp)3.

References

Organouranium compounds
Metallocenes
Cyclopentadienyl complexes
Uranium(IV) compounds
Substances discovered in the 1960s